Syedna Ismail Badruddin (I) Bin Maulaya Raj (died on 23rd Jumada al-Akhirah 1085 AH/1676 AD, Jamnagar, India) was the 34th Da'i al-Mutlaq of the Dawoodi Bohras. He succeeded the 33rd Da'i Syedna Feer Khan Shujauddin to the religious post. Syedna Ismail became Da'i al-Mutlaq in 1085AH/1657AD. His period of Dawat was 1065–1085 AH/1657–1676 AD. He is the first Da'i descendant of Moulaya Bharmal.

Early life
Syedna Ismail Badruddin was born in Jamnagar, in the Kathiawar Peninsula of the modern Indian state of Gujarat, in 990 H/1582 AD. He was the first Dai al-Mutlaq from the line of the royal Rajput vizier Raja Bharmal, who (along with his brother, Raja Tarmal) had become Muslim at the hands of Maulaya Ahmad and Maulaya Abdullah, Du'aat sent to India from Cairo by the 18th Imam Al-Mustansir Billah. They had taken knowledge and trained for this khidmat by Syedna Al-Mu'ayyad fi'l-Din al-Shirazi, the Bab-ul-Abwab of Mustansir Imam.

His full genealogy is as follows: Syedna Ismail Badruddin, son of Maulaya Raj, son of Maulaya Adam, son of Maulaya Dawood, son of Maulaya Raja, son of Maulaya Ali, son of Maulaya Isḥāq, son of Maulaya Ya’qub, son of Raja Bharmal. His grandfather, Maulaya Adam, had made Jamnagar his home, and his father, Maulaya Raj, had established a large trading business there. Previously, Maulaya Raja had settled in Morbi, and earlier, his forefathers had lived in Patan.

Education
Syedna Ismail Badruddin’s father, Maulaya Raj, brought him to Ahmedabad, to the presence of the 27th Da'i Syedna Dawood Bin Qutubshah, when he was twelve years old. Syedna Dawood asked Maulaya Raj about the child, and Maulaya Raj replied that he was his fifth son. He said to Maulaya Raj, “You have conscientiously offered me a fifth of your wealth, but you have yet to offer me the fifth share of your sons.” Maulaya Raj was delighted at this request, and happily gave charge of the young Syedna Ismail to Syedna Dawood (Khumus). Syedna Dawood personally undertook Syedna Ismail’s education. For many years thereafter, Syedna Ismail lived for eight months in Ahmedabad and returned to Jamnagar for the remaining four.

Marriage
Maulaya Raj performed Syedna Ismail’s marriage to a pious lady named Boodi Bai. She gave birth to Syedna Ismail Badruddin’s son and successor, Syedna Abduttayyeb Zakiyuddin II.

Before Dai's position
With wholehearted devotion, Syedna Ismail Badruddin served seven Da'is (27th to 33rd); Syedna Dawood bin QutubShah, Syedna Shaikh-Adam Safiyuddin, Syedna Abduttayyeb Zakiyuddin I, Syedna Ali Shamsuddin, Syedna Qasim-Khan Zainuddin, Syedna Qutub-Khan Qutbuddin, and Syedna Feer-Khan Shujauddin. One of his achievements was the repayment of a major loan in the time of Syedna Qasim-Khan Zainuddin. At the time of a drought in Gujarat, Syedna Badruddin also sent cart loads of rice to the Dai in Ahmedabad for mumineen. Over these years, due to the excellence and sincerity of Syedna Ismail Badruddin and the jealousy and scheming of certain people, Syedna Badruddin endured a number of serious trials. As a result of the scheming, on two occasions, an envoy was sent by the Dai of the time to inquire about the serious and false allegations made against Syedna Ismail Badruddin. Even in the face of such animosity, Syedna Badruddin remained steadfast.

After Dai's position
Among the most significant achievements of Syedna Ismail Badruddin’s reign was a renaissance in Da'wat knowledge. When Syedna Badruddin became Dai, he established a well-ordered institution of learning in Jamnagar. Students came from far and wide. Syedna Badruddin himself taught these students many Dawat books. Around thirty students came to study full time with Syedna Ismail Badruddin.

Syedna Ismail Badruddin was seventy-five when he became Dai. Despite his advanced age, he led for 20 years with physical vigor and spiritual dynamism.

Death
He died on 23 Jumada al-Akhirah 1085 H/1674 AD at the age of ninety five. The Mazar-e-Badri in Jamnagar is the holy mausoleum where Syedna Ismail Badruddin is buried.

References

Further reading 
The Ismaili, their history and doctrine by Farhad Daftary (Chapter -Mustalian Ismailism- p. 300-310)
The Uyun al-akhbar is the most complete text written by an Ismaili/Tayyibi/Dawoodi 19th Dai Sayyedna Idris bin Hasan on the history of the Ismaili community from its origins up to the 12th century CE period of the Fatimid caliphs al-Mustansir (d. 487/1094), the time of Musta‘lian rulers including al-Musta‘li (d. 495/1101) and al-Amir (d. 524/1130), and then the Tayyibi Ismaili community in Yemen.

Dawoodi Bohra da'is
1676 deaths
Year of birth unknown
17th-century Ismailis